Amy Kennedy (née Savell; born November 20, 1978) is an American educator, mental health advocate, and politician from the state of New Jersey. She was the Democratic Party nominee in the 2020 elections to represent  in the United States House of Representatives.

Early life and education 
Amy Savell was born in Atlantic City, New Jersey and raised in Pleasantville and Absecon. Her parents, Leni and Jerry Savell, are both teachers. Jerry also served as a freeholder for Atlantic County, New Jersey, and was a city council member in both Absecon and Pleasantville. She graduated in 1997 from Holy Spirit High School and earned a Bachelor of Science degree in elementary education from Pennsylvania State University. She later earned a Master of Science in environmental education from Nova Southeastern University.

Career 
Kennedy taught middle-school history at Northfield Community Schools. She later became an education director of the Kennedy Forum, a mental health advocacy group founded by her husband.

Politics 
On July 7, 2020, she defeated university professor Brigid Callahan Harrison and former congressional aide Will Cunningham to win the party's nomination. Kennedy's victory was particularly notable as an "upset victory" because Harrison had been supported by George Norcross, a powerful figure in New Jersey politics. As of July 9, 2020, vote totals showed Kennedy winning in all eight counties in the congressional district. She faced Republican incumbent Jeff Van Drew, who was originally elected as a Democrat, in the general election.

According to The Washington Post, Kennedy ran as an "anti-establishment insurgent trying to ride the recent energy of grass-roots activists", and was backed by Martin Luther King III, New Jersey governor Phil Murphy, and House Majority Leader Steny Hoyer. Her campaign focused on mental health issues and education. She is supportive of expanding the Affordable Care Act.

Kennedy raised $1.4 million for her primary campaign, including a $500,000 personal loan.

On August 3, 2020, she received the endorsement of former president Barack Obama. Kennedy lost to Van Drew in the general election.

Personal life 
Kennedy met Mark Petitgout in college, and they married in 2003. The brother of former NFL offensive tackle Luke Petitgout, Mark played football for the Penn State Nittany Lions. They lived in Linwood, New Jersey and had one daughter before divorcing in early 2010.

Kennedy met former United States congressman Patrick J. Kennedy at a mental-health forum in Atlantic City in 2010. They married in July 2011 at the Kennedy family compound in Hyannis Port, Massachusetts, with Supreme Court Justice Stephen Breyer officiating. They live in Brigantine, New Jersey with their five children.

References

External links
 Amy Kennedy website
 Campaign website

 Interview with Amy Kennedy on WNYC

1970s births
Holy Spirit High School (New Jersey) alumni
Amy
Living people
New Jersey Democrats
Nova Southeastern University alumni
Penn State College of Education alumni
People from Absecon, New Jersey
People from Pleasantville, New Jersey
Politicians from Atlantic City, New Jersey
Schoolteachers from New Jersey
Spouses of Rhode Island politicians
Candidates in the 2020 United States elections
20th-century American educators
20th-century American women educators
21st-century American women politicians